Mount Bulusan is a stratovolcano on the island of Luzon in the Philippines.

Bulusan may also refer to:

 Bulusan (municipality), Sorsogon, Philippines
 Lake Bulusan, Luzon Island, Philippines